The 1948 Five Nations Championship was the nineteenth series of the rugby union Five Nations Championship. Including the previous incarnations as the Home Nations and Five Nations, this was the fifty-fourth series of the northern hemisphere rugby union championship. Ten matches were played between 17 January and 29 March. It was contested by England, France, Ireland, Scotland and Wales. The tournament was won by Ireland, who achieved a Grand Slam by defeating all the other participants—a feat they would not accomplish again until 2009.

Participants
The teams involved were:

Table

Results

External links

The official RBS Six Nations Site

Six Nations Championship seasons
Five Nations
Five Nations
Five Nations
Five Nations
Five Nations
Five Nations
Five Nations
Five Nations
Five Nations